The Campos Basin is one of 12 coastal sedimentary basins of Brazil. It spans both onshore and offshore parts of the South Atlantic with the onshore part located near Rio de Janeiro. The basin originated in Neocomian stage of the Cretaceous period 145–130 million years ago during the breakup of Gondwana.

Etymology 
The basin is named after the Campos dos Goytacazes city.

Description 
The Campos Basin is bound on the south by the Cabo Frio High, separating the basin from the Santos Basin and on the north by the Vitória High, forming the boundary with the Espírito Santo Basin. Campos Basin contains the Paraiba do Sul River delta.

Tectonic history 

The South Atlantic margin developed on Archean stable cratons consisting of hard and resistant rocks and partly on the Neoproterozoic mobile belts composed of less resistant metamorphic rocks. The Precambrian basement of the Santos Basin is exposed as the Araçuaí Belt along the Brazilian coast, most notably in the inselbergs of Rio de Janeiro, of which Sugarloaf Mountain is the most iconic. The ancient rocks consist of a Neoproterozoic to Cambrian high-grade metamorphic core of granites and gneisses, formed during the collision of Gondwana in the Pan-African-Brasiliano orogeny. Basalts similar to the Paraná and Etendeka traps, exposed to the west in the Paraná Basin, have been found underlying the Santos Basin. The Tristan da Cunha hotspot, known as the Tristan hotspot, is considered the driver behind the formation of these flood basalts.

During the Early Cretaceous, the former continent Gondwana, as southern part of Pangea, starting to break-up, resulting in a sequence of rift basins bordering the present-day South Atlantic. The Pelotas-Namibia spreading commenced in the Hauterivian, around 133 million years ago and reached the Santos Basin to the north in the Barremian. Seafloor spreading continued northwards to the Campos Basin in the Early Albian, at approximately 112 Ma.

Five tectonic stages have been identified in the Brazilian basins:
 Pre-rift stage – Jurassic to Valanginian
 Syn-rift stage – Hauterivian to Late Barremian
 Sag stage – Late Barremian to Late Aptian
 Post-rift stage – Early to Middle Albian
 Drift stage – Late Albian to Holocene

Stratigraphy 
Oil reservoirs include formations deposited during the Aptian and pre-Aptian continental rift phase, of post-salt Albian-Cenomanian shallow-water marine carbonates and deepwater sandstones, and in turbidites of the open marine drift phase of Late Cretaceous and early Tertiary ages.

The stratigraphy starts with basalt flows dated at 120 Ma, overlain by the Lagoa Feia Group, consisting of the organic-rich lacustrine "green shales" followed by lacustrine limestones and continental sandstones and conglomerates, transitioning into marine sediments with evaporites, limestones, and limestone altered dolomites. The shallow marine limestones of the Macaé Formation follow, then the Namorado turbidite sandstones, and finally the Campos Formation, consisting of the turbidite sandstone Carapebus Member and the prograding slope and shelf Ubatuba Formation.

Exploration 

The off-shore oil exploration in the Campos Basin began in 1968. The first exploratory well was drilled in 1971. The largest fields, listed by their year of discovery year, include Linguado (1978), Carapeba (1982), Vermelho (1982), Marimba (1984), Albacora (1984), Marlim (1985), Albacora-Leste (1986), Marlim Sul (1987), Marlim Leste (1987), Barracuda (1989), Caratinga (1989), Espadarte (1994), Roncador (1996), Jubarte (2002), Cachalote (2002), and Badejo (2008).

Of these fields, 37 are being developed by Petrobras. By 2003, the oil production from the basin had reached 1.21 million barrels per day. The production comes from a variety of reservoirs including siliciclastic turbidites, fractured basalts, coquinas, calcarenites (limestones). The total cumulative production from the Campos Basin by 2003 was 3.9 billion barrels of oil with remaining reserves of 8.5 billion barrels.

In February 2010, a new 65 million barrel discovery was made by Petrobras near the Barracuda oil field.

See also 

 Angola Basin
 Pelotas Basin
 Santos Basin

References

Bibliography and further reading

Brazil general

Campos Basin geology

Campos Basin exploration

External links 
 Real Time Ship Traffic in the Campos Basin

 
Sedimentary basins of Brazil
Geology of Brazil
Geology of the Atlantic Ocean
Landforms of Rio de Janeiro (state)
Oil fields of Brazil